John Alexander defeated Russell Simpson 6-4, 6-3, 6-3 to win the 1983 Benson and Hedges Open singles competition. Tim Wilkison was the champion but did not defend his title.

Seeds
A champion seed is indicated in bold text while text in italics indicates the round in which that seed was eliminated.

  John Alexander (champion)
  Russell Simpson (final)
  Chris Lewis (semifinals)
  Phil Dent (first round)
  Rod Frawley (semifinals)
  Brad Drewett (second round)
  Bernard Mitton (quarterfinals)
  Jeff Simpson (quarterfinals)

Draw

Key
 Q - Qualifier
 NB: The Final was the best of 5 sets while all other rounds were the best of 3 sets.

Final

Section 1

Section 2

References

External links
 Association of Tennis Professional (ATP) – 1983 Men's Singles draw

ATP Auckland Open
1983 Grand Prix (tennis)